Exeristis catharia is a moth in the family Crambidae. It was described by Tams in 1935. It is found on Samoa.

References

Moths described in 1935
Pyraustinae